Svět otevřený náhodám is a 1971 Czechoslovak drama film directed by Karel Steklý.

Cast
 Miloš Kopecký as Rataj
 Josef Bek as Procurist
 Lubomír Bryg
 Slávka Budínová as Innkeeper Marta
 Jiri Ceporan as Sípek
 Jirí Dudesek as Singer
 Zita Kabátová as Mother
 Willy Kuk-Znamínko as Startér
 Eva Lorenzová as Dáma
 Consuela Morávková as Karla
 Milos Nesvadba as Foreman
 Ela Poznerová as Lady
 René Pribil as Eman
 Tomás Sedlácek as Vojta
 Jana Švandová as Slávka
 Oldřich Velen as Merta
 Milada Vnuková as Berticka

References

External links
 

1971 films
1971 drama films
Czech drama films
Czechoslovak drama films
1970s Czech-language films
Films directed by Karel Steklý
1970s Czech films